Wonder Comics is a pop-up imprint of DC Comics. Curated by Brian Michael Bendis, the imprint focuses on reviving old characters and original characters set in the main DC universe.

History
The imprint was announced in October 2018 with one ongoing series and three miniseries, Young Justice, Naomi, Dial H for Hero, and Wonder Twins. Wonder Comics published its first and flagship book in January 2019, Young Justice.

Titles

Season 1

Season 2

References

DC Comics
Publishing companies established in 2018
Warner Bros. Discovery brands
Comic book publishing companies of the United States
American companies established in 2018
DC Comics imprints
2018 in comics